Iberia Flight 062 was a twin-engined Sud Aviation Caravelle registered EC-BDD operating a scheduled flight from Málaga Airport, Spain, to London Heathrow Airport. While on approach to Heathrow on 4 November 1967, the Caravelle descended far below the flight level assigned to it and flew into the southern slope of Blackdown Hill in West Sussex, killing all 37 on board.

Crash sequence
The time of the accident was approximately 10:02 pm, about 5½ minutes after the plane had been cleared to descend from FL110 (11000 ft) to FL60 (6000 ft). Flying at a shallow rate of descent, the Caravelle first clipped trees near Black Down House, then broke through a large hedge and careened across a meadow where 65 sheep were killed outright and 23 more were fatally injured. The disintegrating plane continued on, destroying a garage and damaging parts of the roof of Upper Black Down House.

Aviation fuel caused small fires to break out in the wooded hillside.

Investigation
An investigation could not determine why the aircraft descended through its assigned flight level. Audio recordings taken from air traffic control and from the recovered cockpit voice recorder revealed nothing unusual. The investigation stated that "no evidence was found of any pre-crash failure or defect in either the airframe or the engines, or of any faulty workmanship."

The investigation report gave considerable attention to the possibility that the air crew could have misread their "three-pointer" altimeters, which were designed to warn the pilots with a cross hatch indicator when the altitude was below 10,000 feet. An excerpt from the report stated:

"The aircraft descended continuously at a steady rate over a period of 13½ minutes and the pointers would have been in continuous motion throughout, increasing the likelihood of misreading. The cross hatching in this type of altimeter first appears in a window in the 10,000ft disc at an indicated altitude of 26,666ft and the edge of the cross hatching would have been visible within 2 minutes of the aircraft beginning its descent. At 10,000ft the cross hatching completely fills the window and it remains filled as long as the aircraft is below 10,000ft. Thus the cross hatching would have been visible to the crew for a period of about 9½ minutes before the aircraft passed through FL60 and it is a matter of conjecture whether it was still an effective warning to them at that stage of the descent.

"With this type of altimeter it is not difficult to read an indication of 6,000ft as 16,000ft if particular note is not made of the position of the 10,000ft pointer. Evidence against the possibility of simple misreading of this sort is the message from the aircraft to ATC reporting passing FL145, indicating at this time the crew knew that they were below 16,000ft. "

Victims
Among the dead was British film and TV actress June Thorburn, who was five months pregnant.

The nationality of the 37 casualties are listed below.

See also
 United Airlines Flight 389 – another incident where altimeter misreading is suspected, but not proven

References

Further reading

 Sussex Constabulary (1967). Report on Air Disaster at Blackdown Hill, Sussex, 4 November 1967 [by] Supt G. Dinley [West Sussex Record Office].

External links
1967 Newsreel footage of the crash wreckage from British Pathé (Record No:44981) at YouTube
Fernhurst Society page on the crash, includes hand-drawn police map of crash site and newsreel video link
Flight International, 30 August 1970, p. 264 (PDF) – includes a summary of the Board of Trade crash report
Photograph of Caravelle EC-BDD – taken two months before the crash
The Fernhurst Air Disaster: 50 Years On
Inventory of items in the UK National Archives relating to the crash – of interest to researchers

Aviation accidents and incidents in 1967
Airliner accidents and incidents involving controlled flight into terrain
Aviation accidents and incidents in England
Accidents and incidents involving the Sud Aviation Caravelle
Iberia (airline) accidents and incidents
Disasters in Sussex
1967 in England
Airliner accidents and incidents in the United Kingdom
November 1967 events in the United Kingdom
1967 disasters in the United Kingdom